Donald R. Katz (born January 30, 1952) is the founder and executive chairman of Audible, Inc. Founded in 1995 and headquartered in Newark, New Jersey, Audible.com serves millions of listeners and offers over 300,000 downloadable audiobooks, audio editions of periodicals, and other programs. Audible also commercialized the first portable digital audio player in 1997, four years before the introduction of the iPod. In 2004, Katz was awarded the Ernst & Young Entrepreneur of the Year Award for New Jersey.  Audible was a publicly traded Nasdaq company until it was acquired and became a subsidiary of Amazon.com in early 2008. Audible operates sixteen global outlets, including websites in the UK, Germany, France, Australia, Italy, Japan and most recently Canada.

Named one of NJ.com's "25 Most Influential People in New Jersey" in 2016, Katz has also been recognized as one of America's Top 25 Disruptive Leaders by Living Cities for his work on behalf of urban transformation in Newark. Katz was the recipient of a Tribeca Disruptive Innovation Award in 2013.

Katz also founded Newark Venture Partners (NVP), a venture fund focused on creating a high tech innovation hub in Newark. The fund is housed in Audible's headquarters and provides capital, company-building services and residence to innovative tech startups. The fund's inaugural accelerator class launched September 2016.

Katz assumed the position of founder and executive chairman on January 2, 2020. Bob Carrigan, former CEO of Dun & Bradstreet, stepped into the role of CEO of Audible.

Biography
Katz was born in Chicago, Illinois on January 30, 1952. He graduated from New York University in 1974, where he studied with Ralph Ellison, who had been made Albert Schweitzer Professor of Humanities. Katz credits his idea to work in the field of audiobooks to studying under Ellison, with his emphasis on literature being something more than text and something that should be heard and performed, saying "I studied literature with Ralph as much as I read his work and talked about writing… Audible is testament, in many ways, to what I learned from him." He also attended The University of Chicago as well as The London School of Economics, from which he holds an MSc Economics. He lives in Montclair, New Jersey.

Career as author 

Before founding Audible, Katz was an author and journalist for twenty years. He is the author of Home Fires: An Intimate Portrait of One Middle-Class Family in Postwar America (1992), nominated for a National Book Critics Circle Award; The Big Store: Inside the Crisis and Revolution at Sears (1987), winner of the Chicago Tribune Heartland Prize for Nonfiction; and Just Do It: The Nike Spirit in the Corporate World (1994). Katz served as a contributing editor for Rolling Stone, Esquire, Outside, Sports Illustrated, Men's Journal and Worth.  He received an Overseas Press Club award for his coverage of foreign affairs, and his writing won or was nominated for several National Magazine Awards. A two-volume collection of Katz's award-winning magazine stories, King of the Ferret Leggers and Other True Stories and Valley of the Fallen and Other Places was published in 2001. Home Fires was reissued in 2014 in audiobook and ebook formats, featuring a new introduction by Jonathan Alter.

Works
The King of the Ferret Leggers and Other True Stories. 2001. 
The Valley of the Fallen and Other Places. 2001. 
Just Do It: The Nike Spirit in the Corporate World. 1994. 
Home Fires: An Intimate Portrait of One Middle-Class Family in Postwar America. 1992, 2014. 
The Big Store: Inside the Crisis and Revolution at Sears. 1987.

Notes

External links

1952 births
Living people
New York University alumni
Amazon (company) people
American technology chief executives
American male journalists
People from Chicago
People from Montclair, New Jersey